Patridge is a surname. Notable people with the surname include:

 Audrina Patridge (born 1985), actress and model
 Rob Patridge, American politician
 Scott Patridge (born 1965), tennis player 
 Stewart Patridge (born 1974), American football quarterback

See also
 
 Paltridge